El Gordo catástrofe is a 1977 Argentine film.

Cast
 Jorge Porcel as Catrasca
 Moria Casán as Dr. Linda Winters 
 Graciela Alfano as Graciela 
 Osvaldo Terranova as Dr. Galindez
 Adolfo García Grau as Don Carlos
 Beto Gianola as Igor
 Perla Caron as Tamara
 Nathán Pinzón
 Juan Carlos Galván
 Jacques Arndt
 Max Berliner
 John O'Connell
 Tony Middleton
 Horacio Nicolai
 Juan Vitali
 Fernando Iglesias
 María Bufano
 Délfor Medina
Anita Bobasso la viejita
 Inés Murray as  Anciana
 Jesús Pampín
 Cayetano Biondo
 Abel Sáenz Buhr
 Alicia Muñiz 
Alberto Olmedo as himself

External links
 

1977 films
Argentine comedy films
1970s Spanish-language films
1970s Argentine films